John Goodman (c. 1540–1604), of Lincoln's Inn, London, was an English politician.

He was a Member (MP) of the Parliament of England for Lichfield in 1586.

References

1540 births
1604 deaths
Members of Lincoln's Inn
English MPs 1586–1587